Hungary–Russia relations are the bilateral foreign relations between the two countries, Hungary and Russia. During the Second World War, the Soviet army occupied Hungary, and in 1948 the Soviet Union took full control of the country.  It became part of the Warsaw Pact military alliance and the Comecon economic union.  Relations between the two countries were damaged in 1956 due to the Soviet military intervention in the revolution occurring in Hungary.  Hungary expelled its communist government in 1989, and diplomatic relations with Russia were restored after the breakup of the USSR in 1991.

Hungary has an embassy in Moscow and two consulate-generals (in Saint Petersburg and Yekaterinburg). Russia has an embassy in Budapest and a consulate-general in Debrecen.

Both countries are full members of the Organization for Security and Co-operation in Europe.

History

Earlier contacts
In the thirteenth century, a Hungarian Dominican monk Julian traveled to the East in search of the ancestral home of the Hungarians.

Hungary and Imperial Russia to 1917
The Hungarian Revolution of 1848 under Lajos Kossuth gained strong support across Hungary from 1848 to 1849. The young Austrian Emperor Franz Joseph appealed to Tsar Nicholas I for aid.  He sent a large force that had been based in nearby Congress Poland and it suppressed the revolt. However, the military intervention was unpopular among the ordinary soldiers and the liberal officers of the Russian army. It was sharply criticized by such democrats as Alexander Herzen and Nikolay Chernyshevsky.

Hungary and the Soviet Union

In World War II Hungary was an ally of Germany. When Germany declared war on the Soviet Union in 1941, Hungary tried to remain neutral. Studies in Diplomatic History & Historiography in Honour of GP Gooch (1962), p153-168.</ref>

The People's Republic of Hungary (Magyar Népköztársaság) was the official state name of Hungary from 1949 to 1989 during its Communist period under the control of the Soviet Union. Following the Soviet occupation of Hungary after World War II, the Soviets set up a police system that persecuted all opposition through direct force and propaganda, hoping this would lead to a Communist victory in the elections of 1946 . Despite these efforts, the Hungarian Communist Party came in third place in the elections, prompting the Soviets to directly impose a puppet government the following year. The next few years were spent consolidating power, using the ÁVH secret police to suppress political opposition through intimidation, false accusations, imprisonment and torture. The worst of the repression came under the rule of Mátyás Rákosi.  At the height of his rule, Rákosi developed a strong cult of personality. Dubbed the "bald murderer", Rákosi imitated Stalinist political and economic programs, resulting in Hungary experiencing one of the harshest dictatorships in Europe.Gati, Charles, Failed Illusions: Moscow, Washington, Budapest, and the 1956 Hungarian Revolt, Stanford University Press, 2006 , page 9-12  He described himself as "Stalin's best Hungarian disciple" and "Stalin's best pupil".  After Khrushchev's "Secret Speech" denouncing Stalin's cult of personality, Rákosi was ultimately removed from power and replaced by the reformist Imre Nagy, who attempted to take Hungary out of the Soviet bloc. This led to the Hungarian Revolution of 1956, which was brutally crushed by the Soviets.  Following the crushing of the revolution, the Soviets instituted János Kádár as the leader of Hungary.  After an initial period of repressions against the revolutionaries, Kádár implemented a more moderate form of communism, which he referred to as "Goulash Communism."  He would rule until 1988, when he was removed from power just before the "revolution" that ended Communism in Hungary.

Hungary and the Russian Federation
After 1991, Hungarian-Russian relations improved steadily.  This was due in part to the election of Prime Minister Viktor Orbán in 2010 and the announcement of his foreign relations plan, the "Eastern Opening Policy."  Created in opposition to Hungary's Western coalitions such as the European Union, NATO, and the United Nations, the Eastern Opening plan heavily prioritized Russia as a viable ally, and efforts were taken to secure that tight relationship throughout 2013–2014.  One major proof of this is the bilateral agreement between the two nations over the nuclear plant Paks in Hungary, which called into the question the risk of Hungary becoming financially dependent on Russia for more than a few decades.

Following the Russian military intervention in Ukraine in 2014, Prime Minister Viktor Orbán rejected the Russian sanctions despite European Union pressure. This has led outside officials in the EU and NATO to accuse Hungary as a "Trojan Horse", acting ultimately in the interests of Russia. The PACE (Parliamentary Assembly of the Council of Europe) delegations of both countries voiced a protest against Ukraine's "Indigenous law" (Russian delegation to PACE voices protest over Ukraine law on indigenous peoples, 2021).

In 2017, Vladimir Putin visited Budapest to meet with Orbán to discuss bilateral ties.  As a response to the reaction to the poisoning of Sergei and Yulia Skripal in the United Kingdom, in April 2018, one Hungarian embassy staffer was expelled from Russia. In May 2019, concerned over the tightening relations between Hungary, Russia, and also China, the Trump administration hosted Orbán in D.C, raising criticism from the EU and UN.

After the 2022 Russian invasion of Ukraine started, Hungary, as one of the EU countries, imposed minor sanctions on Russia, while Russia added all EU countries to the list of "unfriendly nations". Despite the issues, Hungary remained mostly neutral to the conflict although it opposed harsh sanctions especially in the oil sector. Orbán, speaking at a meeting of the Hungarian governing party in Balatonalmádi in September 2022, identified EU sanctions and restrictive measures against Russia as major causes for the 2022 inflation surge and 'global economic war'.

LGBT issues

Both countries legalized homosexuality while opposing same-sex marriages. Russia outlawed pro-LGBT messaging directed towards minors in 2013, while Hungary banned its schools from promoting LGBT material towards children in June 2021, which met with reaction from the European Union.

See also
 Hungary–Soviet Union relations
 Foreign relations of Hungary
 Foreign relations of Russia
 György Gilyán
 Russia–European Union relations

References

Further reading
 Ignotus, Paul. "The first two Communist takeovers of Hungary: 1919 and 1948." Studies on the Soviet Union (1971) 11#4 pp 338–351. 
 Roberts, Ian W. Nicholas I and the Russian intervention in Hungary (Springer, 1991), in 1849
 Rock, Kenneth W. "Schwarzenberg versus Nicholas I, Round One: The Negotiation of the Habsburg-Romanov Alliance against Hungary in 1849." Austrian History Yearbook 6 (1970): 109–141.
 Young, Ian. "The Russians in Hungary, 1849" History Today'' 7#4 (1957) online

External links

 Embassy of Hungary in Moscow 
 Embassy of the Russian Federation in Budapest

 
Russia
Bilateral relations of Russia